Rustem Gabdulbariyevich Akhmetzyanov (born 10 June 1978) is a former Russian professional football player.

Club career
He played in the Russian Football National League for FC Rubin Kazan in 1999.

References

External links
 

1978 births
Footballers from Kazan
Living people
Russian footballers
Association football midfielders
FC Rubin Kazan players
FC Sever Murmansk players